Darin Clifford Hinshaw (born June 6, 1972) is an American football coach and former quarterback who is currently the offensive coordinator at the University of Central Florida (UCF). Prior to UCF, he was an offensive coordinator at the University of Alabama-Birmingham (UAB). He played college football at UCF, where he finished his career as the program's leader in career passing yards and touchdowns.

Playing career

College
Hinshaw was initially recruited by Florida by Galen Hall, but committed to UCF after Hall's successor Steve Spurrier recruited Hinshaw's high school quarterback rival to play for the Gators. At UCF, he set multiple career program records in both passing yards and touchdowns, many that have since been broken. He was also a member of the school's men's basketball team for the 1993–94 season when they made the NCAA Tournament.

Professional
After going undrafted in the 1995 NFL Draft, Hinshaw signed with the Cleveland Browns, but only lasted four days with the team. He had brief stints with multiple CFL expansions teams in 1995 before spending two seasons with the Orlando Predators of the Arena Football League (AFL). He also had stints with the Granite State Warriors of the Eastern Football League and the AFL's Nashville Kats.

Coaching career

Early career
After retiring from professional football, Hinshaw returned to his alma mater UCF in 1999 as a graduate assistant. UCF promoted him to quarterbacks coach in 2000 working with Coach Mike Kruczek and Gene Chizik.

Middle Tennessee
Hinshaw was soon hired at Middle Tennessee as a running backs coach in 2001, working his way up to offensive coordinator by 2005. During his time they won the 2001 Sun Belt Champion. In 2001, the Blue Raiders had two of the top five rushers in the SBC along with the top overall rushing attack. He helped coach both record breaking running backs Dwone Hicks and ReShard Lee. In 2002, the Blue Raiders had the nation's No. 21 ranked rushing offense, a 1,000-yard rusher, and a two of the top eight rushers in the SBC. In 2003, the Blue Raider offense went down as the highest scoring unit in the Sun Belt Conference at 27.7 points a contest, including four games of 35 points or more. The unit ranked 37th nationally in passing efficiency and had the fifth ranked receiver in the country Tyrone Calico.

Georgia Southern
He left Middle Tennessee to accept the offensive coordinator position at Georgia Southern in 2006, where he spent one season as the head of the Eagles offense.

Memphis
Hinshaw was named the wide receivers coach at Memphis in 2007. Under his guidance he helped mentor Duke Calhoun and Carlos Singleton who both set multiple records at Memphis.

Tennessee
He joined the coaching staff at Tennessee in 2010 as quarterbacks coach under first-year head coach Derek Dooley. Hinshaw helped direct the Tennessee offense to 5,711 yards in 2012, the second-most in school history. He helped mentor both Matt Simms and Tyler Bray to combined for 3,309 yards passing and 26 touchdowns in 2010. Bray earning SEC freshmen honors three times. In 2011, Rivals.com named him a  Top 10 recruiter. 2012, he was reassigned to recruiting coordinator and wide receivers coach. In 2012, Coach Dooley was fired at the end of the 2012 season and Hinshaw was not retained on the staff.

Cincinnati
Hinshaw was hired as the passing game coordinator and quarterbacks coach at Cincinnati in 2013 on the staff of another head coach in its first season with their program, Tommy Tuberville. In 2013, the Bearcats led the American Athletic Conference in total offense (472.1) and rushing offense (168.3). In 2015, Cincinnati amassed (537.8) yards per game, which was 6th in the nation.  Several offensive players went onto the NFL such as Chris Moore, Parker Ehinger, Blake Annen, Tion Green, and Deyshawn Bond. He signed several good recruits such as Kahlil Lewis and Marquise Copeland.

Kentucky
Hinshaw was named the co-offensive coordinator and quarterbacks coach at Kentucky in 2016, following Cincinnati offensive coordinator Eddie Gran. He helped lead Kentucky to the best season in school history (10-3) and the Citrus Bowl victory against Penn State. The Wildcat offense generated 2,000 rushing yards and 2,000 passing yards three times (2016, 2017 and 2018) during Hinshaw’s tenure, the first time in school history Kentucky accomplished that in three straight seasons. He helped mentor wide receiver and kick returner Lynn Bowden to learn to play quarterback. Under Henshaw’s guidance, he excelled and later was honored Manning Award Quarterback of the Week and later won the Paul Hornung Award. He and Gran were fired after the 2020 season when the Kentucky offense ranked towards the bottom in many offensive categories.

UAB
UAB Interim Head coach Bryant Vincent announced the hiring of Hinshaw on July 29, 2022. At UAB as the offensive coordinator, the program set multiple records for total yards (5,697), rushing yards (3,063), yards per game (438.2) and rushing yards per game (235.6). Under his leadership, UAB running back DeWayne McBride turned in the most decorated season in school history, finishing the regular season as the nation's leading rusher with 1,713 yards. McBride would earn the Walter Camp second-team All-America honors, as well as being named the Conference USA Offensive Player of the Year and a first-team Conference USA selection.

UCF
August 2, 2021 he was hired as an analyst returning to his alma mater, UCF. After one-season at UAB, Hinshaw was once again hired by his alma mater UCF as the offensive coordinator on January 3, 2023.

References

External links
 
 UAB profile
 UCF profile
 Tennessee profile

1972 births
Living people
American football quarterbacks
Birmingham Barracudas players
Cincinnati Bearcats football coaches
Cleveland Browns players
Georgia Southern Eagles football coaches
Kentucky Wildcats football coaches
Memphis Tigers football coaches
Memphis Mad Dogs players
Middle Tennessee Blue Raiders football coaches
Nashville Kats players
Orlando Predators players
Ottawa Rough Riders players
San Antonio Texans players
Tennessee Volunteers football coaches
UAB Blazers football coaches
UCF Knights football coaches
UCF Knights football players
UCF Knights men's basketball players
People from Punta Gorda, Florida
Players of American football from Florida
Coaches of American football from Florida
Basketball players from Florida